Dot and Tot of Merryland is a 1901 novel by L. Frank Baum. After Baum wrote The Wonderful Wizard of Oz, he wrote this story about the adventures of a little girl named Dot and a little boy named Tot in a land reached by floating on a river that flowed through a tunnel. The land was called Merryland and was split into seven valleys. The book was illustrated by artist W. W. Denslow, who had illustrated three previous Baum books.

Unlike The Wonderful Wizard of Oz, Dot and Tot of Merryland contained no tipped in color plates, but was filled with colored text illustrations. There were four full page pictures. The book is the last Baum book that was illustrated by W. W. Denslow.

Dot and Tot of Merryland was first published by the Geo. M. Hill company of Chicago in 1901. Books of Wonder reprinted Dot and Tot of Merryland with minor text alterations and new illustrations by Donald Abbott. The reprint contains no color illustrations, but Mr. Abbott styled his after the Denslow illustrations. Although Baum and Denslow were hoping for another hit after the popularity of The Wonderful Wizard of Oz, it met with very little commercial success.

Plot
Evangeline "Dot" Freeland is sent to her rich father's country estate Roselawn for her health. She soon meets the gardener's son "Tot" Thompson, who becomes her friend and playmate. One day, they have a picnic and sit in a boat they find by the river, which gets away and takes them to a passage in a cliff face that brings them to the magical country of Merryland.

Merryland is made of seven valleys, arranged in a circular pattern connected by a river running through them. The first valley is populated by clowns, the second is a land in which everything—including the people—is entirely made of candy, and the third the valley where babies grow from blossoms before storks deliver them to their parents. The fourth valley is populated by living dolls and is also the home of the Queen of Merryland, a large wax doll who makes Dot and Tot her adopted children. After Dot and Tot have a day of running the valley by themselves, the queen joins Dot and Tot to see the remaining three valleys.

The fifth valley is populated entirely by cats, the sixth valley is run by Mr. Split, who makes wind up animals. The final valley is the Valley of Lost Things, where every lost item goes. Tot finds a doll he'd lost and is allowed to take it with him. The Queen decides to allow Dot and Tot to travel onward, which will take them back to Roselawn, but she will close the way to Merryland forever. Returning to the river, Dot is found by her father who notices that she no longer looks sickly. Tot deduces that the Queen of Merryland—who was either interrupted or forgot to answer when asked her name—must be named "Dolly."

Legacy
The book was adapted into a musical by Jennifer Kirkeby with music and lyrics by Michael Pretasky for the Stages Theater Company, debuting July 11, 2003 in Hopkins, Minnesota.

The Candy Man from the second valley and the Queen of Merryland attend Ozma's birthday party in L. Frank Baum's 1909 book The Road to Oz. Baum's map of the surrounding countries of Oz—first seen as an endpaper in Tik-Tok of Oz (1913)—depicts Merryland as being across the desert from the Land of Oz and north of Hiland and Loland. These link the book to L. Frank Baum's famous Oz series.

The 2014 issue of Oziana from the International Wizard of Oz Club contains two short stories that serve as follow ups to the book: "Lost and Never Found" by David Tai and Jared Davis finds Oz characters Trot and Betsy Bobbin finding themselves in the Valley of Lost Things and meeting the Queen before finding a nearly impossible way out. "Roselawn" by Jared Davis introduces adult versions of Dot and Tot in 1919, in which Dot has become an accomplished illustrator and is reunited with Tot, who suffers from post traumatic stress disorder after serving in World War I.

See also

References

External links
 
 On Dot and Tot of Merryland
 

1901 American novels
1901 fantasy novels
American fantasy novels
Children's fantasy novels
Books by L. Frank Baum